His Eminence (1898 – c.1906) was an American Thoroughbred racehorse that was bred in Kentucky and is best known for winning the 1901 Kentucky Derby. He was a bay colt sired by the great turf-racer Falsetto out of the mare Patroness. His dam (with His Eminence in utero) was sold to Overton H. Chenault at the 1897 Woodburn Stud dispersal sale for $75. As a yearling, he was sold to J. B. Lewman for $500[1].

His Eminence was ridden in the 1901 Derby by African-American jockey James Winkfield. His Eminence also won the Clark Handicap as a three-year-old.

The colt was purchased in the latter part of 1901 for $15,000 by millionaire racing enthusiast Clarence Mackay as a stud horse, but was later sold in 1902 due to the death of Mackay's father. His Eminence was then returned to racing by his new owner, Fred Gebhard, as a five-year-old, winning the 1903 Omnium Handicap at the Sheepshead Bay Race Track.

The stallion was once again sold at auction in September 1903 to A.C. Jaeger for $2,900. He was again sold to William Collins Whitney who trained him for steeplechasing, but His Eminence was killed while trying to jump a hurdle sometime before 1910.

Pedigree

References

1898 racehorse births
Racehorses trained in the United States
Racehorses bred in Kentucky
Kentucky Derby winners
Thoroughbred family 12